America's Big Deal is an American business reality television series that premiered on October 14, 2021 on USA Network.

Premise
Aired live from Newark Symphony Hall in Newark, New Jersey, the series features amateur entrepreneurs pitching ready made products to home viewers. At the episodes end the contestant with the highest sales total gets a chance to strike a deal with one of three retailers, Lowe's, Macy's and QVC/HSN.

References

USA Network original programming
2021 American television series debuts
2020s American reality television series
Business-related television series